is a Japanese professional footballer who plays as a defender for Fujieda MYFC player.

Playing career
Nobuyuki Kawashima joined to Tochigi Uva FC in 2014. In 2015, he moved to Thespakusatsu Gunma. In July 2016, he moved to Fujieda MYFC.

Club statistics
Updated to 23 February 2018.

References

External links

Profile at Fujieda MYFC
Profile at Giravanz Kitakyushu

1992 births
Living people
Tokyo International University alumni
Association football people from Tokyo
Japanese footballers
J2 League players
J3 League players
Japan Football League players
Tochigi City FC players
Thespakusatsu Gunma players
Fujieda MYFC players
Giravanz Kitakyushu players
Association football defenders